Shane Horton (born July 25, 1988) is an American football linebacker who is currently a free agent. He played college football at USC. His brother is Wes Horton, defensive end for the Carolina Panthers.

Early years
He attended Notre Dame High School in California. In the 2006 high school season, he was to the All-CIF Pac-5 Division first team and was selected to the Los Angeles Daily News All-Area first team. He also was named to the Super Prep All-Farwest, Prep Star All-West and the Cal-Hi Sports All-State third team.

Professional career

Toronto Argonauts
On December 19, 2012, he signed with the Toronto Argonauts of the Canadian Football League as an undrafted free agent.

On October 3, 2014, Horton was released by the Argonauts.

Personal
Shane's father is Michael (Myke) Horton, former UCLA offensive lineman who played nine years as a backup on various NFL, CFL and USFL teams before becoming nationally known as "Gemini", one of the original American Gladiators (1989–1992).

References

External links
USC bio

1988 births
Living people
American players of Canadian football
American football linebackers
American football safeties
Canadian football linebackers
Edmonton Elks players
Players of American football from Los Angeles
Toronto Argonauts players
UNLV Rebels football players
USC Trojans football players
Players of Canadian football from Los Angeles